The Back River is a  tidal channel in the town of Boothbay, Maine, in the United States. It defines the east and south sides of Barters Island and connects with the Sheepscot River, which forms the west side of the island.  The Cross River joins the north end of the Back River with the Sheepscot River to the west.

See also
Back River (Kennebec River)
List of rivers of Maine

References

Maine Streamflow Data from the USGS
Maine Watershed Data From Environmental Protection Agency

Rivers of Lincoln County, Maine
Boothbay, Maine